Leslie Irvine Hull (born December 21, 1935) was a Canadian politician. He served in the Legislative Assembly of New Brunswick from 1974 to 1987, as a Progressive Conservative member for the constituency of York South, and later served a term as mayor of Fredericton, New Brunswick from 2001 to 2004.

He was also a candidate for mayor of Fredericton in the October1999 by-election following the resignation of Brad Woodside, but lost to Sandy DiGiacinto by just 41 votes. He defeated DiGiacinto in the 2001 regular election.

References

Progressive Conservative Party of New Brunswick MLAs
1935 births
Living people
Mayors of Fredericton